Alfred Foster may refer to:

 Alfred Foster (judge) (1886–1962), Australian judge
 Alfred Foster (mathematician) (1904–1994), American mathematician